Slanská Huta is a village and municipality in Košice-okolie District in the Košice Region of eastern Slovakia.

History
In historical records the village was first mentioned in 1772.

Geography
The village lies at an altitude of 460 metres and covers an area of 14.157 km².
It has a population of about 215 people.

Ethnicity
The population is entirely Slovak in ethnicity.

Culture
The village has a small public library and several stores including food facilities.

Sport
The village has a number of quality sporting facilities including a football ground, a swimming pool and a gym.

Transport
The nearest train station is at Slanec.

External links

Villages and municipalities in Košice-okolie District